The Maja e Çikës, at  above sea level, is the highest peak of the Ceraunian Mountains in Albania. The Ceraunians extends approximately  along the Albanian Riviera in a northwesterly direction from Sarandë to the Karaburun Peninsula.

The climate is mediterranean, having hot summers and generally warm to cool, dry winters. Furthermore, the mount falls within the Illyrian deciduous forests terrestrial ecoregion of the Palearctic temperate broadleaf and mixed forests biome. The mount is also part of the Llogara National Park, which is noted for its rich biodiversity and vegetation. The western flank of the mount is vegetated by species such as the Bulgarian fir, Austrian pine, Bosnian pine and Macedonian pine.

See also  
 Geography of Albania
 Biodiversity of Albania 
 Climate of Albania
 Llogara National Park

References 

Mountains of Albania
Geography of Vlorë County
Albanian Ionian Sea Coast
Llogara National Park